Obrajillo is a village belonging to the municipality of Canta, a two hours drive from Lima, Peru. It is situated in beautiful landscape. The Chillón River cuts the settlement. The village is known for farming and selling truchas (trout).

Visitors also can find another dishes such as Tallarin con Perdiz, Cuyes, Patasca o Sopa de Mote, moreover visitors can buy cheese, butter, honey and meal. Others benefits are the communication that it is good because Obrajillo has Internet and public telephones, markets and discos.

Another flashy place is the waterfall near the electrical center, surrounded for many beautiful mountains where visitors can explore and ride around this beautiful place. There are many tourist facilities; the people of Obrajillo are kind and friendly.

References 

Populated places in Peru